FDD may refer to:

Politics
CNDD-FDD, a political party in Burundi
Forum for Democracy and Development, a political party in Zambia
KAZE-FDD, a political party in Burundi

Science and technology
Floppy disk drive
Frequency-division duplex, a telecommunications duplex indexing method
Frequency domain decomposition, a system identification technique
LTE-FDD, a 4G telecommunications technology and standard
Timex FDD, a nearly complete computer by Timex
UMTS-FDD, an air interface standard in 3G mobile telecommunications networks
Fault detection and diagnostics, by Automated Logic Corporation

Other uses
Feature-driven development, a project management approach
Forces for the Defense of Democracy, a rebel group in Burundi
Foundation for Defense of Democracies, a policy institute based in Washington, D.C., US
Franchise disclosure document (2008), UFDD/UFOC Uniform Franchise Offering Circular
The Danish Scout Council, formerly the Fællesrådet for Danmarks Drengespejdere
"F.D.D.", the opening theme to the anime Chaos;Head sung by Kanako Itō